The Amazing Race Canada 1 is the first season of The Amazing Race Canada, a reality game show based on the American series The Amazing Race. It features nine teams of two with pre-existing relationships who raced around Canada and is hosted by Canadian Olympian Jon Montgomery. The grand prize includes a  cash payout, two Chevrolet Corvette Stingrays and unlimited air travel for a year with Air Canada. The show was produced by Insight Productions, in association with Bell Media and was broadcast on CTV.

The series premiere aired on July 15, 2013 on CTV, with the season finale airing on September 16, 2013.

Father and son Timothy "Tim" Hague, Sr. and Timothy "Tim" Hague, Jr. were the winners of this season. They were the first parent-child team to win in any Amazing Race franchise and at the time were the first team to win after overcoming two Speed Bumps.

Production

Development and filming

The first season was filmed from May 3 to May 24, 2013.

The winning team earned CAD$250,000, a pair of Chevrolet Corvette Stingrays, and Air Canada executive passes for unlimited international air travel for a year.

The series' premiere sponsorship partners included Air Canada, BlackBerry, Chevrolet, and Interac.

During the airing of the episode for Leg 3, a message read by host Jon Montgomery recognized that the 2013 Alberta floods had occurred since the filming of the leg and prior to the series premiere. The message encouraged viewers to donate to flood relief and rebuilding efforts.

The Leg 5 Pit Stop was originally scheduled to be on the grounds of the Saskatchewan Legislative Building; however, unexpected warm weather brought more people out to enjoy the day outdoors. This unforeseen circumstance forced producers to move the Pit Stop to nearby Pine Island (a more secluded spot).

On May 8, 2013, Toronto City Council granted permission for Insight Productions to film a television episode for "3 participants rappelling over the West Tower roof onto the podium green roof of City Hall" on May 24, 2013. Ultimately, this permit was a ruse to prevent fans from recording teams rappelling off a different building and posting it online.

Casting
Casting began on December 20, 2012 with an online site for submission of applications and audition videos.

Cast

Notable contestants included Body Break hosts Hal Johnson and Joanne McLeod, amputee veteran Jody Mitic, and actress Vanessa Morgan.

Future appearances
At the live start of Season 7 on April 23, 2019, it was revealed that Jet & Dave would return to compete for a second time, as the winners of a public vote that closed on April 1.

Vanessa Morgan competed on the Paramount Network reality competition Lip Sync Battle in 2019.

Results
The following teams participated in this season, with their relationships at the time of filming. Note that this table is not necessarily reflective of all content broadcast on television due to inclusion or exclusion of some data.

A  placement with a dagger indicates that the team was eliminated.
An  placement with a double-dagger indicates that the team was the last to arrive at a pit stop in a non-elimination leg, and had to perform a Speed Bump task in the following leg.
 An italicized and underlined placement indicates that the team was the last to arrive at a pit stop, but there was no rest period at the pit stop and all teams were instructed to continue racing. There was no required Speed Bump task in the next leg.
 A  indicates that the team used an Express Pass on that leg to bypass one of their tasks.
A  indicates that the team used the U-Turn and a  indicates the team on the receiving end of the U-Turn.

Notes

Prizes
The prize for each leg is awarded to the first place team for that leg. Trips are sponsored by Air Canada.
Leg 1 – Two round trip plane tickets to Sydney, Australia, and two Express Passes.
Leg 2 – Two round trip plane tickets to anywhere in Asia.
Leg 3 – Two round trip plane tickets to anywhere in the United States.
Leg 4 – An all-inclusive trip to Cancún, Mexico, from Air Canada.
Leg 5 – Two round trip plane tickets to anywhere in Canada.
Leg 6 – Two round trip plane tickets to anywhere in Europe.
Leg 7 – Two round trip plane tickets to anywhere in the Caribbean.
Leg 8 – Two round trip plane tickets to anywhere in South America.
Leg 9 – Air Canada Altitude Super Elite 100K status for a year and a BBM Video Chat on a brand new BlackBerry Z10.
Leg 10 – A CA$250,000 cash payout, air travel for a year anywhere Air Canada flies worldwide in Executive First Class, and two Chevrolet Corvette Stingrays.

 An item that can be used to skip any one task of the team's choosing up and until the seventh leg. The winning team keeps one for themselves and may give the second to another team before the end of the third leg.

Race summary

Leg 1 (Ontario → British Columbia)

Airdate: July 15, 2013
Niagara Falls, Ontario, Canada (Oakes Garden Theatre) (Starting Line)
Niagara Falls (Niagara Parks Butterfly Conservatory)
 Toronto (Toronto Pearson International Airport) to Kelowna, British Columbia (Kelowna International Airport)
Kelowna (Stuart Park – The Kelowna Bear)
Kelowna (Kelowna Yacht Club – Houseboat) (Overnight Rest)
Kelowna (Lakefront Watersports Kiosk)
  Okanagan Valley (Lake Okanagan)
Myra-Bellevue Provincial Park (Bellevue Trestle) 
Westbank (Quails' Gate Winery) 

In this series' first Roadblock, teams had to travel by personal watercraft to a diving platform using a rudimentary map of Lake Okanagan. There, one team member had to don diving gear, take a dive cage to the bottom of Lake Okanagan, and search for a statue of Ogopogo, where they would find their next clue.

In this leg's second Roadblock, the team member who did not perform the previous Roadblock had to walk across a narrow plank attached to a railway trestle and suspended high above the canyon in order to retrieve their clue dangling off the edge of the plank. They then had to jump off the plank to the ground to meet their partner before continuing.

Additional tasks
At the Niagara Parks Butterfly Conservatory, teams had to search the conservatory for one of nine terrariums, each containing a variety of creatures and two clues. Each team member had to reach into the terrarium and retrieve a clue, which contained an Air Canada ticket voucher for their first destination: Kelowna, British Columbia. The terrariums containing more dangerous creatures held tickets for the earlier flight. Four teams would be on the first flight with the remaining five teams on the second flight arriving 90 minutes behind the first.
At Stuart Park, teams had to find a model of the yellow Interac truck, where they would find their next clue along with an Interac debit card that would serve as the teams' source of money for the rest of the season.

Additional notes
While in Ontario, teams were provided a Chevrolet Spark as their transportation.
While in British Columbia, teams were provided a Chevrolet Equinox as their transportation.
The clue after the second Roadblock instructed teams to drive to the Pit Stop and contained a Quails' Gate wine bottle label, leaving teams to figure out that they had to drive to the winery. This aspect of the clue went unaired in the episode.

Leg 2 (British Columbia)

Airdate: July 22, 2013
 Kelowna (Kelowna International Airport) to Vancouver (Vancouver International Airport)
Sea Island (Vancouver International Airport – Maple Leaf Lounge)
Richmond (Richmond Olympic Oval) 
Vancouver (Chinatown – Millennium Gate)
 Vancouver (Ten Ren Tea & Ginseng Company and Dr. Sun Yat-Sen Classical Chinese Garden or Chinatown and Chinese Cultural Centre)
Vancouver (DP World Container Terminal)
Vancouver (Vancouver Convention Centre – Green Roof) 

In this leg's Roadblock, one team member had to complete two laps of short track speed skating in under 90 seconds to receive their next clue from champion speed skater Michelle Pepin.

This series' first Detour was a choice between Draw It or Dance It. In Draw It, teams travelled to Ten Ren's Tea & Ginseng Company, where each team member would drink a cup of green tea. Printed on the bottom of each saucer was a Chinese symbol representing one of the twelve animals of the Chinese zodiac. They would have to memorize these characters, then go to the Dr. Sun Yat-Sen Classical Chinese Garden, reproduce them with a calligraphy brush on a rice paper, and give it to a calligraphy expert. If the characters were incorrectly reproduced, teams would start all over again with new Chinese symbols. Once the calligraphy expert was satisfied with both symbols, she would give teams their next clue. In Dance It, teams went to the Chinese Cultural Centre, where they would receive a list of destinations written entirely in Mandarin Chinese. They would have to travel to these locations in Chinatown to find the four pieces of a Chinese lion costume. Then, they had to return to the Cultural Centre, where they would have to put on the outfit and successfully perform a traditional lion dance to receive their next clue.

Additional task
At the DP World Container Terminal, teams had to climb to the top of a shipping crane and use a pair of binoculars to search for flags marking the location of the next Pit Stop: the green roof at Vancouver Convention Centre.

Leg 3 (British Columbia → Alberta)

Airdate: July 29, 2013
Vancouver (Nicola Internet Cafe)
 Vancouver (Vancouver International Airport) to Calgary, Alberta (Calgary International Airport)
Calgary (Statue of Outlaw)
Calgary (Ranchman's Cookhouse) 
Drumheller (Hoodoos)
 East Coulee (Atlas Coal Mine) or Drumheller (Royal Tyrrell Museum)
Starland County (Horsethief Canyon Outlook) 

In this leg's Roadblock, one team member had to learn and then correctly perform a classic Canadian line dance to receive their next clue from a professional line dancer.

This leg's Detour was a choice between Lump by Lump or Bone by Bone. In Lump by Lump, teams travelled to the Atlas Coal Mine and rode a locomotive called "Linda" to the wash house, where they dressed up in coal mining outfits. They then had to shovel coal into a mine cart so that it overflowed and touched all four edges of the cart and properly place their numbered-tag on the cart to receive their next clue. In Bone by Bone, teams travelled to the Royal Tyrrell Museum, where they would study a mounted display of a dinosaur's skeleton. They then had to enter the specimen preparation laboratory and completely build a model of the same skeleton from memory to receive their next clue.

Additional tasks
At Nicola Internet Cafe, teams had to book their flight to Calgary on the Air Canada website.
Once in Calgary, teams had to choose a marked Chevrolet Silverado and drive themselves to the statue of "Outlaw" in Downtown Calgary to find their next clue.

Leg 4 (Alberta → Northwest Territories → Yukon)

Airdate: August 5, 2013
 Calgary (Calgary International Airport) to Yellowknife, Northwest Territories (Yellowknife Airport)
Yellowknife (Bush Pilot's Monument)
Yellowknife (Government Dock)
Yellowknife (Great Slave Lake – Yellowknife Bay Floating Bed & Breakfast) 
 Yellowknife (Yellowknife Airport – Arctic Sunwest Charters) to Carcross, Yukon (Carcross Airport)
Carcross (White Pass and Yukon Railway Last Spike – "The Duchess") 
 Carcross (Bennett Lake)
Carcross (Carcross Desert) 

In this leg's Roadblock, one team member had to complete a polar bear dip. They had to strip down to a bathing suit and socks, jump into a hole cut into the ice, and retrieve their clue from the opposite side of the freezing water.

For their Speed Bump, Tim Sr. & Tim Jr. had to correctly memorize and recite the first four stanzas of "The Shooting of Dan McGrew" to a Robert W. Service impersonator before they could continue with the Detour.

This leg's Detour was a choice between Yukon Supply Run or Klondike Gold Rush. In Yukon Supply Run, teams had to use the provided tools and materials to build a raft and had to paddle themselves, as well as some supplies, out into the lake to retrieve their next clue. In Klondike Gold Rush, teams completed three games inspired by the task's namesake. First, they would have to use a two-man saw to cut off a slice of wood from a log. Next, both team members would have to toss a hatchet and have it stick to a wooden target. Finally, one team member would ride in a wheelbarrow and had to direct their blindfolded partner around a course while collecting five "gold nuggets" in a gold pan, which could be exchanged for their next clue. Vanessa & Celina used the Express Pass given to them by Kristen & Darren to bypass the Detour.

Additional tasks
Upon arrival in Yellowknife, teams had to drive themselves in a Chevrolet Traverse to Bush Pilot's Monument and search the grounds for their next clue.
After completing the Roadblock, teams had to find Arctic Sunwest Charters at the Yellowknife Airport, where they had to sign up for one of three charter flights, each departing 20 minutes apart. The first two bush planes would carry two teams each, while the last plane would carry three teams.
After completing the Detour, team members had to drive an ATV to the Pit Stop at Carcross Desert.

Leg 5 (Yukon → Saskatchewan)

Airdate: August 12, 2013
Whitehorse (Yukon River) (Pit Start)
Whitehorse (SS Klondike)
 Whitehorse (Erik Nielsen Whitehorse International Airport) to Regina, Saskatchewan (Regina International Airport)
Regina (Saskcan Pulse Trading Company)
Regina (RCMP Heritage Centre)  
Regina (Regina City Hall – 'I Love Regina' Sign)
 Regina (Mosaic Stadium at Taylor Field)
Regina (Mosaic Stadium at Taylor Field – Luxury Box between Sections 26 and 27) 
Regina (Wascana Centre – Pine Island) 

In this leg's Roadblock, one team member had to dress in a RCMP cadet uniform and take a supply of clothes to a boot camp bedroom known as "the pit", where they had to place their clothes in the closet and cabinets and make their bed exactly like a prepared room. If a sergeant major believed the room met RCMP standards, assistant commissioner Roger Brown would give racers their next clue. If not, the sergeant major would dump any misplaced clothes onto the bed and the team member would have to start again.

There was a Fast Forward in this leg as Vanessa is seen holding a Fast Forward clue in her hand; however, it was unaired but included driving a police car simulation.

This leg's Detour was a choice between Brawn or Beauty. In Brawn, teams had to perform a series of Canadian football drills. Then, one team member had to catch a touchdown pass from coach Khari Jones, while the other team member had to complete a field goal to receive their next clue from Khari. If teams failed, they had to run a lap around the field and start over. In Beauty, teams had to learn a choreographed cheerleading routine composed of dance, cartwheels, and flips. Then, they had to correctly perform the routine for Saskatchewan Roughriders fans to receive their next clue from team mascot Gainer the Gopher.

Additional tasks
At the SS Klondike, teams had to search the decks for their next clue.
Upon arrival in Regina, teams had to search the airport parking lot for a Chevrolet Trax, where they would find a BlackBerry Z10, which they tapped with the parking attendants' Z10 to reveal turn by turn directions to their next location.
At Saskcan Pulse Trading Company, teams had to dig through dry bulk trailer full of lentils to find two Sergeant Bullmoose plush toys (one tagged "RCMP" and the other tagged "Heritage Centre"), which led to their next clue.
At Regina City Hall, teams had to perform a Ukrainian dance to receive their next clue.

Leg 6 (Saskatchewan → Quebec)

Airdate: August 19, 2013
 Regina (Regina International Airport) to Quebec City, Quebec (Québec City Jean Lesage International Airport)
Lévis (Lévis Forts National Historic Site) (Overnight Rest)
 Lévis (Levis Ferry Terminal) to Quebec City (Port of Quebec)
 Quebec City (Château Frontenac (Dufferin Terrace – Statue of Samuel de Champlain)
 Quebec City (Place Royale  – Notre-Dame-des-Victoires or Parc de la Cetière and 102 Rue du Petit-Champlain)
Quebec City (Place de l'Université-du-Québec )  
Quebec City (Plains of Abraham – Terrain de Sport)
Quebec City (The Battlefields Park – Avenue Saint-Denis) 

This leg's Detour was a choice between Sculpt It or Spot It. In Sculpt It, teams had to travel to Place Royale near Notre-Dame-des-Victoires and choose an ice block with an outline of a star, a house or a boat. Then, they had to chisel the ice to create an ice sculpture and get their next clue. In Spot It, teams had to find a replica of the Rue du Petit-Champlain mural in Parc de la Cetière with missing items. They then had to find the original mural at 102 Rue du Petit-Champlain and then place magnets with Québécois French words in the appropriate spots to receive their next clue.

In the leg's Roadblock, one team member had to take orders from two patrons in Québécois French. Team members then had to find the correct ingredients from their order and prepare four crêpes, two savory and two sweet. A chef would demonstrate how to properly make and plate the crêpes. Once they correctly made and served all four crêpes, the chef would give them the next clue.

Additional tasks
Upon arrival in Quebec City, teams had to travel to Lévis Forts National Historic Site in Lévis, where they had to search their next clue when the fortress opened in the morning.
After finding their clue at Lévis Forts, teams had to board a ferry across the Saint Lawrence River and take the Old Quebec Funicular to Château Frontenac, where they find the statue of Samuel de Champlain at Dufferin Terrace to find their next clue.
At the Plains of Abraham, teams had to play lacrosse. Each team member had to catch a pass from their partner and score a goal to receive their next clue.

Leg 7 (Quebec → Nunavut)

Airdate: August 26, 2013
 Quebec City (Québec City Jean Lesage International Airport) to Iqaluit, Nunavut (Iqaluit Airport)
Baffin Region (Sylvia Grinnell Territorial Park)
Baffin Region (Sylvia Grinnell Territorial Park – Sylvia Grinnell River) 
Baffin Region (Frobisher Bay) 
Iqaluit (Hudson's Bay Company Trading Post) 
Iqaluit (Panoramic Lookout) 

This leg's Detour was a choice between Harpoon Hunter or Igloo Builder. They then both had to throw a traditional harpoon and hit the colored-center of a target. Once both team members were successful, the other team member had to pull the sled back to the starting point to receive their next clue. In Igloo Builder, teams had to build an igloo using only the tools provided and pre-cut  blocks of snow. Once the Inuit elder believed that the igloo could withstand an arctic night, he would give teams their next clue.

For their Speed Bump, Tim Sr. & Tim Jr. had to lead a dog sled team across Frobisher Bay to retrieve a food cache and deliver it back to the starting point before they could continue racing.

In this leg's Roadblock, one team member had to consume an entire serving of muktuk – 10 pieces of whale skin and blubber – to receive their next clue.

Additional tasks
On the Iqaluit Airport tarmac, teams would find their next clue written entirely in Inuktitut, leaving them to figure out that their next clue was at Sylvia Grinnell Territorial Park.
At Sylvia Grinnell Territorial Park, teams had to locate two throat singers near the Sylvia Grinnell River and listen to an Inuit throat singing performance to receive their next clue.
After the Detour, teams had to travel by snowmobile across Frobisher Bay to the Hudson's Bay Company Trading Post.

Leg 8 (Nunavut → Nova Scotia)

Airdate: September 2, 2013
 Iqaluit (Iqaluit Airport) to Halifax, Nova Scotia (Halifax Stanfield International Airport)
Halifax (Pier 21) (Overnight Rest)
Mahone Bay (St. James' Anglican Church)
 Mahone Bay (Gazebo Cafe – Gazebo)
Lunenburg (Fisheries Museum of the Atlantic)
 Lunenburg (Lunenburg Harbour and Grand Banker Seafood Bar & Grill or Boscawen Inn and Zwicker Wharf)
Lunenburg (St. John's Anglican Church) 
Lunenburg (Bluenose II ) 

In this leg's Roadblock, one team member had to search for the scarecrow pictured on a BlackBerry Z10. Once they found the scarecrow, they had to bring it to a gazebo, where they had to build a copy of it with the items provided. When they were ready for inspection, they had to take a photograph of the scarecrow with the Z10 and hand it to a scarecrow expert. If the expert was satisfied, he would give teams their next clue.

This leg's Detour was a choice between Surf or Turf. In Surf, teams made their way to Lunenburg Harbour, where they had to board a lobster fishing boat and pull six lobster traps from the sea. They then had to band the claws of each lobster and then deliver them to the Grand Banker Seafood Bar & Grill to receive their next clue. In Turf, teams had to make their way to Boscawen Inn, where they were presented with samples of 12 different kinds of sausages and had to memorize their German names. They then had to run to Zwicker Wharf and identify the 12 sausages from another, unlabeled set of samples to receive their next clue.

Additional tasks
At the Halifax airport, teams found a USB flash drive inside their Chevrolet Sonics, which contained a message that teams had to play on the car's MyLink video system and directed them to Pier 21.
When Pier 21 opened, teams received a passport and had to find seven different stamps and ink the seven stamps onto the passport to receive their next clue.
At St. John's Anglican Church, teams received a Canadian dime, which features the Bluenose sailing ship on its reverse. Teams had to make their way to its successor, the Bluenose II, which was in a Lunenburg drydock at the time, to find the Pit Stop.

Leg 9 (Nova Scotia → Newfoundland and Labrador)

Airdate: September 9, 2013
 Lunenburg to North Sydney, Cape Breton Island (North Sydney Ferry Terminal)
 North Sydney (North Sydney Ferry Terminal) to Port aux Basques, Newfoundland and Labrador (Port aux Basques Ferry Terminal)
St. John's (The Rooms) (Unaired)
St. John's (Trans-Canada Highway Mile Zero – Terry Fox Memorial Site)
St. John's (Quidi Vidi – Quidi Vidi Brewing Company)
St. John's (Shea Heights Overlook)
 Petty Harbour–Maddox Cove (Petty Harbour Fisherman's Co-op – Dock) or St. John's (Harbourside Park and Holloway Street)
St. John's (O′Brien's Music Store)
 St. John's (George Street)
St. John's (Cape Spear) 

This season's final Detour was a choice between Tell a Tale or Wag a Tail. In Tell a Tale, teams travelled to the Petty Harbour dock, where they listened to two local fishermen tell a story in Newfoundland slang. They then had to relay the story, word-for-word, to a group of nearby listeners to receive their next clue. In Wag a Tail, teams made their way to Harbourside Park and chose a Newfoundland dog. They would then load up a cart with four dozen eggs and 12 bottles of milk and had to lead the dog up the extremely steep Holloway Street, known as "Heart Attack Hill", to deliver these goods, undamaged, to four households to receive their next clue. If the eggs or milk bottles broke, they had to go back to the bottom of the hill and restock.

In this leg's Roadblock, one team member could use any items available to them in the music store to perform on George Street and earn C$50 from passersby to receive their next clue from a street fiddler.

Additional tasks
At Port aux Basques, teams had to run to one of three waiting shuttles that would take teams overnight to St. John's. The first shuttle carried one team. The second shuttle also carried one team, which left 15 minutes after the first vehicle. The third shuttle carried two teams and left fifteen minutes after the second vehicle.
After arriving in St. John's, teams had to search the grounds of The Rooms to find their next clue, which went unaired.
At the Quidi Vidi Brewing Company, teams had to recite Terry Fox's inspirational quote at the monument that they had earlier memorized at St. John's Terry Fox Memorial Site ("I just wish people would realize that anything’s possible if you try, dreams are made if people try"). If correct, they would be granted entry into a traditional Newfoundland kitchen party, where each team member had to kiss a cod and drink a shot of Newfoundland Screech.
After completing the Roadblock, teams had to find the Pit Stop at the most easterly point in North America, leaving them to figure out that it was Cape Spear, not the nearby Fort Amherst.

Leg 10 (Newfoundland and Labrador → Ontario)

Airdate: September 16, 2013
 St. John's (St. John's International Airport) to Toronto, Ontario (Toronto Pearson International Airport)
Toronto (L Tower) 
Toronto (Cadbury Gladstone Chocolate Factory)
Toronto (Toronto Zoo)
Toronto (Evergreen Brick Works) 
 Toronto (Jack Layton Ferry Terminal to Centre Island Dock)
Toronto (Toronto Islands – Olympic Island) 

In this leg's first Roadblock, one team member had to rappel face-first down the side of the L Tower, a building that was under construction at that time, about 44 stories tall. When they reached the roof of another three story building, they would reunite with their partner and could open the clue they received at the top of the building.

In this season's final Roadblock, the team member who did not perform the previous Roadblock had to match the provincial and territorial flags with the floral emblems visited during this season onto a map board. If racers were sharp, they would have noticed the flags printed onto their Pit Start clue and that the Pit Stop greeters on each leg and the corporate president of Cadbury Canada wore the floral emblem of their province or territory. The flag and emblem associated with each location are:

{| class="wikitable"
! Locale
! Flag
! Flower
|-
| British Columbia
| Flag of British Columbia
|  Pacific Dogwood
|-
| Alberta
| Flag of Alberta
|  Wild Rose
|-
| Northwest Territories
| Flag of the Northwest Territories
|  Mountain Avens
|-
| Yukon
| Flag of Yukon
|  Fireweed
|-
| Saskatchewan
| Flag of Saskatchewan
|  Western Red Lily
|-
| Quebec
| Flag of Quebec
|  Blue Flag Iris
|-
| Nunavut
| Flag of Nunavut
|  Purple Saxifrage
|-
| Nova Scotia
| Flag of Nova Scotia
|  Mayflower
|-
| Newfoundland and Labrador
| Flag of Newfoundland and Labrador
|  Purple Pitcher Plant
|-
| Ontario
| Flag of Ontario
|  White Trillium
|}
Once all the flags and emblems were paired up on the map, teams would receive their final clue.

Additional tasks
After landing in Toronto, teams had to search outside Pearson International Airport for a woman wearing a maple leaf baseball cap with their next clue.
After completing the first Roadblock, each team was given a Cadbury Caramilk bar inside their clue envelope, leaving them to figure out that they had to find the Cadbury Gladstone Chocolate Factory.
At the Cadbury Chocolate Factory, teams had to search through cartons of Cadbury Caramilk bars to find one of three "golden chocolate bars". Once they found one, they could proceed to the president's office, where they would be given a golden key to unlock a safe, where their next clue was located.
At the Toronto Zoo, teams had to search the grounds for their next clue, which had been set up inside the panda exhibit.

Additional note
At the start of the leg, teams received a free upgrade to business class on their flight to Toronto.

Episode title quotes
Episode titles are often taken from quotes made by the racers.
"Where in the World is Ogopogo?" – Producer Named
"Se Hou Leng" – Non-Racer 
"Hoodoos and Hoodonts" – Producer Named
"Grab a 'Nug" – Dave
"Death By Lentils" – Producer Named
"Check the Cannons!" – Jet
"We Don't Have Time for the Bathroom" – Tim Sr.
"Clutch and Release" – Producer Named
"Ah-mazing" – Jet & Dave and Vanessa & Celina
"The Family Race Off" – Producer Named

Ratings
The season ranked as the number one new show in Canada, and the number one show in Canada for the year, with an average audience of 3.5 million viewers.

 Episode 4, "Grab a Nug", aired on Civic Holiday Monday.
 Episode 8, "Clutch and Release", aired on Labour Day.

References

External links

 01
2013 Canadian television seasons
Television shows filmed in Ontario
Television shows filmed in British Columbia
Television shows filmed in Alberta
Television shows filmed in the Northwest Territories
Television shows filmed in Yukon
Television shows filmed in Regina, Saskatchewan
Television shows filmed in Quebec
Television shows filmed in Nunavut
Television shows filmed in Nova Scotia
Television shows filmed in Newfoundland and Labrador